Melathu Veettil Raghavan (5 May 1933 – 9 November 2014) was a veteran Communist leader and a former Minister in Kerala state of India. He was the General Secretary of the Communist Marxist Party, an alliance partner in the United Democratic Front. Prior to the formation of the CMP he was a prominent leader of the Communist Party of India (Marxist).

He was expelled from the CPI(M) following an inner party struggle in which he advocated alliance with the Kerala Congress and Indian Union Muslim League against the official line of keeping these two parties out of Left Democratic Front (LDF). He then formed the CMP and later joined the United Democratic Front (UDF). He was a minister in UDF governments a number of times.

He belongs to Kannur district in the North Malabar area of Kerala.  His district is one of the developing zones in the country. Raghavan set up the first co-operative sector medical college in the country, Pariyaram Medical College in Kannur District.  He was the key person to build the first Visha Chikitsa Kendram (Snake Venom Removal Centre) in Pappinisseri, Kannur district. His other major achievement has been the setting up of a Snake Park in Dharmasala, which has become a major tourist attraction.

Positions held
 Member, 4th Kerala Legislative Assembly from Madayi – CPI(M) 
 Member, 5th Kerala Legislative Assembly from Thaliparamba – CPI(M) 
 Member, 6th Kerala Legislative Assembly from Kuthuparamba – CPI(M) 
 Member, 7th Kerala Legislative Assembly from Payyannur – CPI(M)
 Member, 8th Kerala Legislative Assembly from Azhikode – CMP 
 Member, 9th Kerala Legislative Assembly from Kazhakkootam – CMP 
Member, 11th Kerala Legislative Assembly from Trivandrum-West-CMP
 Minister for Co-Operation, Government of Kerala, 24 June 1991 to 9 May 1996 
 Minister for Co-Operation and Ports, Government of Kerala, 17 May 2001 to 20 April 2006
 President, Pappinissery Panchayat, Kannur (16 years)

Personal life

Raghavan was born to Shankaran Nambiar on 5 May 1933 in Kannur. He was married to Janaki. The couple have three sons, notable being M. V. Nikesh Kumar, a journalist and a daughter.

Since 2005, Raghavan was bed-ridden with advanced Parkinson's disease. He died on 9 November 2014. at the age of 81. He was cremated with full state honours at Payyambalam Beach Crematorium, near the memorials of Swadeshabhimani Ramakrishna Pillai, A. K. Gopalan, K. G. Marar and E. K. Nayanar.

References

External links
Rediff On The NeT: Communist Marxist Party leader M V Raghavan in a no-holds-barred interview about his recent arrest
 http://www.niyamasabha.org/codes/members/m533.htm

Malayali politicians
Politicians from Kannur
1933 births
2014 deaths
Communist Marxist Party politicians
Communist Party of India (Marxist) politicians from Kerala
Kerala MLAs 1970–1977
Kerala MLAs 1977–1979
Kerala MLAs 1980–1982
Kerala MLAs 1982–1987
Kerala MLAs 1987–1991
Communist Party of India politicians from Kerala